Gaanderen is a village in the Dutch province of Gelderland. It is located in the municipality of Doetinchem. The number of inhabitants is around 5,575 (2020).

It was first mentioned around 1200 as de Gernere, and means "tapering land on a sandy ridge".

Gaanderen was home to 482 people in 1840. The St Martinus Church dates from 1913 and is a replacement of a 1854 church. The tower of the old church remained.

Transportation
 Railway Station: Gaanderen
 Rijksweg Doetinchem - Terborg

Gallery

References

Populated places in Gelderland
Doetinchem